Dominion 6.19 was a professional wrestling pay-per-view (PPV) event promoted by New Japan Pro-Wrestling (NJPW). The event took place on June 19, 2010, in Osaka, Osaka, at the Osaka Prefectural Gymnasium. The event featured nine matches, three of which were contested for championships. Much like the previous year, Dominion 6.19 also featured wrestlers from Pro Wrestling Noah; namely Go Shiozaki, Muhammad Yone and Naomichi Marufuji. It was the second event under the Dominion name.

Storylines
Dominion 6.19 featured ten professional wrestling matches that involved different wrestlers from pre-existing scripted feuds and storylines. Wrestlers portrayed villains, heroes, or less distinguishable characters in the scripted events that built tension and culminated in a wrestling match or series of matches.

Event
The event also saw Shinsuke Nakamura make his return from a shoulder injury, defeating the debuting former WWE wrestler and mixed martial artist Daniel Puder. The match led to Nakamura and Puder teaming up for the 2010 G1 Tag League. During the event, Bad Intentions (Giant Bernard and Karl Anderson) captured the IWGP Tag Team Championship, starting a reign, which would become the longest in the title's history. The event featured the culmination of a storyline rivalry between Hiroshi Tanahashi and Toru Yano in a Hair vs. Hair match, where Tanahashi was victorious. Following the match, Tajiri made a surprise return to the promotion, saving Tanahashi from Yano and Takashi Iizuka and helping him shave Yano bald. This also led to Tanahashi and Tajiri teaming up for the 2010 G1 Tag League. The event concluded with NJPW's Togi Makabe and Prince Devitt declaring the promotion's supremacy over Pro Wrestling Noah, with Devitt having captured the IWGP Junior Heavyweight Championship from Naomichi Marufuji and Makabe retaining the IWGP Heavyweight Championship against Go Shiozaki.

Results

References

External links
The official New Japan Pro-Wrestling website

2010
2010 in professional wrestling
June 2010 events in Japan
Professional wrestling in Osaka